Upernavik Airport  is an airport located  northeast of Upernavik, a town in Avannaata municipality in northwestern Greenland, capable of serving STOL aircraft. It is used as a transfer airport for passenger/cargo traffic to northern Greenland (Qaanaaq Airport), and serves as a local helicopter hub of Air Greenland with flights to settlements in the Upernavik Archipelago.

Airlines and destinations 

Air Greenland operates government contract flights to villages in the Upernavik Archipelago. These mostly cargo flights are not featured in the timetable, although they can be pre-booked. Departure times for these flights as specified during booking are by definition approximate, with the settlement service optimized on the fly depending on local demand for a given day.

References

Airports in Greenland
Airports in the Arctic
Upernavik Archipelago